Linc is a masculine given name, usually a shortened version (hypocorism) of Lincoln. It may refer to:

People:
 Lincoln Alexander (1922–2012), first black Canadian Member of Parliament, first black federal cabinet minister and Lieutenant Governor of Ontario
 Lincoln Linc Blakely (1912–1976), American Major League Baseball player in 1934
 Lionel Linc Chamberland (1940–1987), American jazz guitarist
 Linc Darner (born 1970), American college basketball head coach
 Lincoln D. Faurer (1928–2014), US Air Force lieutenant general, director of the National Security Agency and Chief of the Central Security Service
 Henry Lincoln Johnson (1870–1925), African-American attorney and politician
 Gudjon Lincoln Linc Johnson (1899–1970), Canadian curler

Fictional characters:
 Lincoln Case, one of the main characters on the 1950s television series Route 66
 Linc Hayes, one of the main character on the 1960s and '70s television series The Mod Squad
 Linc McCray, one of the main characters of the 1971 television series The Chicago Teddy Bears, played by Dean Jones

See also
 Fred Lincoln Link Wray (1920-2005), American rock and roll guitarist, songwriter and vocalist

Lists of people by nickname
Hypocorisms